Microcrambus matheri is a moth in the family Crambidae. It was described by Alexander Barrett Klots in 1968. It has been recorded from the US states of Florida, Georgia, South Carolina and West Virginia.

The wingspan is about 15 mm. Adults have been recorded on wing from June to October.

References

Crambini
Moths described in 1968
Moths of North America